"It Don't Matter" is a song by Brazilian disc jockey Alok, American musical duo Sofi Tukker and Romanian singer Inna. It was released as an exclusively streamable Spotify Single on 7 May 2021 by Controversia. The track was written by Nick Audino, Charlotte Bühler, Sofi Tukker's Sophie Hawley, Lewis Hughes, OHYES and Alok, while the production was handled by Alok alongside Hughes, OHYES and Sofi Tukker. Musically, "It Don't Matter" has been described as a deep house song by music critics and talks about having thoughts of a special someone regardless of that person's distance. Aided by a lyric video uploaded to YouTube simultaneously with the track's release, "It Don't Matter" reached number 27 on Billboard US Dance/Electronic Songs chart, as well as the top five in the Commonwealth of Independent States (CIS), Hungary, Russia and Poland. It received a gold certification in the latter country and a platinum one in Brazil.

Background and composition
"It Don't Matter" was written by Nick Audino, Charlotte Bühler, Sofi Tukker's Sophie Hawley, Lewis Hughes, OHYES and Alok―credited under his real name Alok Achkar Peres Petrillo―while the production was handled by Alok, Hughes, OHYES and Sofi Tukker. It was exclusively released for streaming on Spotify as a Spotify Single on 7 May 2021 by Controversia, a Spinnin' Records imprint owned by Alok. Upon premiere, the song was included on various million-follower playlists on the platform, most notably Mint―the largest electronic music playlist―New Music Friday, Dance Paradise and Girls' Might. A remix of "It Don't Matter" made by Ekanta Jake, Alok's mother, was issued the day before the original track's release by Controversia. "It Don't Matter" was eventually released on digital platforms other than Spotify in November 2021.

Musically, "It Don't Matter" is a bass-driven deep house song about having thoughts of a special someone regardless of that person's distance. While Kaido Strange of Mxdwn Music opined that the track could be about the artists' fans, We Rave You Lilla Vásárhelyi praised the song's catchiness and noticed a "haunting and electrifying melody that will strike an emotional chord after every listening". Alex Ștefănescu, writing for InfoMusic, thought that "It Don't Matter" was "rhythmic, but somewhat discreet and soft". The song's lyrics in the refrain include: "It don't matter where I go, it don't matter where I'll be / 'Cause you're always in my head like a song I can't forget".

Promotion and commercial performance
An accompanying lyric video for "It Don't Matter" was uploaded to Alok's YouTube channel on 7 May 2021, having been edited by Sergio Twardowski and featuring motion lyrics programmed by Brandon Ventura. The clip also includes footage of the artists travelling around the world for concerts prior to the COVID-19 pandemic, prompting Strange to notice their "joy... of touring and performing for people". For further promotion, Inna performed the track live during her Summer Live Sessions series on YouTube on 17 August 2021, and at the 2021 Untold Festival with Alok in October 2021.

Upon release, "It Don't Matter" debuted and peaked at number 27 on Billboard US Dance/Electronic Songs chart with 509,000 first-week domestic streams. It served as Alok's third, Sofi Tukker's eighth and Inna's first entry on the ranking; the song is the latter's first to enter a dance Billboard chart since her 2010 single "Sun Is Up" had peaked at number four on the publication's Dance/Mix Show Airplay ranking. Later in 2021, "It Don't Matter" further reached number three in Poland, as well as numbers two and five in Russia and the Commonwealth of Independent States (CIS), respectively. In 2022, the song was certified platinum in Brazil and gold in Poland.

Track listing

Charts

Weekly charts

Monthly charts

Year-end charts

Certifications

References

2021 songs
2021 singles
Alok (DJ) songs
Inna songs
Sofi Tukker songs
Song recordings produced by Sofi Tukker